The Copenhagen Derby is a Danish football rivalry between Brøndby and Copenhagen.

Matches
As of 28 October 2021

Abbreviations
DSL – Danish Superliga
DC – Danish Cup
RL – Royal League

Total
This gives a total of:

Other statistics
The biggest win in the series came in the Superliga on 16 May 2005 at Brøndby Stadium, when Brøndby defeated Copenhagen by a scoreline of 5–0.
 
Highest attendance: 41,201

Honours

References

Further reading
 Jens Jam Rasmussen and Michael Rachlin, "Slaget om København" (The battle of Copenhagen), Denmark, 2005, 

Football rivalries in Denmark
F.C. Copenhagen
Brøndby IF
1992 establishments in Denmark